The Cathedral of the Holy Family is a late 20th-century church that serves as the Cathedral—together with the Co-Cathedral of St. Joseph the Worker—of the Roman Catholic Diocese of Samoa–Pago Pago in American Samoa, an unincorporated territory of the United States.  It is located in the Ottoville district of Tafuna, the largest city in the territory.

The construction of the cathedral began between the late 1980s and early 1990s and it opened in 1995.  It is known for its art pieces, which incorporate the Samoan culture.

Architecture

Exterior

Interior
The interior of the church is noted for its mixture of European and local Samoan features in its design.  This is demonstrated in the stained glass windows and numerous pieces of art adorning the cathedral.  A 1991 painting by Duffy Sheridan features the Holy Family, with a Samoan beach as the setting.

See also
List of Catholic cathedrals in the United States
List of cathedrals in the United States

References

Roman Catholic churches completed in 1994
Holy Family, Tafuna
Tafuna, American Samoa
1994 establishments in American Samoa
20th-century Roman Catholic church buildings in the United States